M320 is an extremely potent and long acting opioid. It produces long lasting narcosis in different animals, including mice, rats, cats, guinea pigs, dogs and monkeys. M320 is a μ and κ-opioid receptor agonist.

See also 
 Bentley compounds
 Carfentanil
 Etonitazene
 Etorphine (M99)
 Fentanyl

Reference

Semisynthetic opioids
4,5-Epoxymorphinans
Mu-opioid receptor agonists
Kappa-opioid receptor agonists